Evan "Michael" Pearce Hardy (13 November 1927 – 13 January 1994) was an English rugby union player who represented the England national rugby union team. He also played for the Combined Services, the Army and Yorkshire County. He also played a first-class cricket match with the Combined Services and was a member of the MCC and I Zingari (IZ) clubs.

Playing as a fly half, India born Hardy was capped three times for England, all in the 1951 Five Nations Championship.  Those matches were against Ireland, France and Scotland.

Hardy, a right-handed batsman, played some non first-class matches with the Army in 1950. His only first-class appearance came nine years later when he lined up for the Combined Services against Warwickshire in Birmingham. He made a duck in his debut innings when he was dismissed by Jack Bannister, with the Warwickshire paceman achieving the rare feat of claiming 10 wickets in an innings. In his second innings he made 15 before falling again to Bannister.

References

External links
Cricinfo: Evan Hardy

1927 births
1994 deaths
English rugby union players
Yorkshire County RFU players
England international rugby union players
English cricketers
Combined Services cricketers
Combined Services rugby union players
British Army cricketers
Rugby union fly-halves